The Indigenous peoples of the Great Basin are Native Americans of the northern Great Basin, Snake River Plain, and upper Colorado River basin. The "Great Basin" is a cultural classification of indigenous peoples of the Americas and a cultural region located between the Rocky Mountains and the Sierra Nevada, in what is now Nevada, and parts of Oregon, California, Idaho, Wyoming, and Utah. The Great Basin region at the time of European contact was ~. There is very little precipitation in the Great Basin area which affects the lifestyles and cultures of the inhabitants.

Great Basin peoples

Fremont culture (400 CE–1300 CE), Utah
Kawaiisu, southern inland California
Timbisha or Panamint or Koso, southeastern California
Washo, Nevada and California
Palagewan
Pahkanapil

Northern Paiute
Northern Paiute, eastern California, Nevada, Oregon, southwestern Idaho
Kucadikadi, Mono Lake Paiute, California
Bannock, Idaho

Mono
Mono, southeastern California
Eastern Mono (Owens Valley Paiute), southeastern California
Western Mono, southeastern California

Southern Paiute
Southern Paiute, Arizona, Nevada, Utah
Chemehuevi, southeastern California
Kaibab, northwestern Arizona
Kaiparowits, southwestern Utah
Moapa, southern Nevada
Panaca
Panguitch, Utah
Paranigets, southern Nevada
Shivwits, southwestern Utah

Shoshone

 Eastern Shoshone people:
 Guchundeka', Kuccuntikka, Buffalo Eaters
 Tukkutikka, Tukudeka, Mountain Sheep Eaters, joined the Northern Shoshone
 Boho'inee', Pohoini, Pohogwe, Sage Grass people, Sagebrush Butte People

 Northern Shoshone people:
 Agaideka, Salmon Eaters, Lemhi, Snake River and Lemhi River Valley
 Doyahinee', Mountain people
 Kammedeka, Kammitikka, Jack Rabbit Eaters, Snake River, Great Salt Lake
 Hukundüka, Porcupine Grass Seed Eaters, Wild Wheat Eaters, possibly synonymous with Kammitikka
 Tukudeka, Dukundeka', Sheep Eaters (Mountain Sheep Eaters), Sawtooth Range, Idaho
 Yahandeka, Yakandika, Groundhog Eaters, lower Boise, Payette, and Weiser Rivers

 Western Shoshone people:
Kusiutta, Goshute (Gosiute), Great Salt Desert and Great Salt Lake, Utah
Cedar Valley Goshute
Deep Creek Goshute
Rush Valley Goshute
Skull Valley Goshute, Wipayutta, Weber Ute
Tooele Valley Goshute
Trout Creek Goshute
Kuyatikka, Kuyudikka, Bitterroot Eaters, Halleck, Mary's River, Clover Valley, Smith Creek Valley, Nevada
Mahaguadüka, Mentzelia Seed Eaters, Ruby Valley, Nevada
Painkwitikka, Penkwitikka, Fish Eaters, Cache Valley, Idaho and Utah
Pasiatikka, Redtop Grass Eaters, Deep Creek Gosiute, Deep Creek Valley, Antelope Valley
Tipatikka, Pinenut Eaters, northernmost band
Tsaiduka, Tule Eaters, Railroad Valley, Nevada
Tsogwiyuyugi, Elko, Nevada
Waitikka, Ricegrass Eaters, Ione Valley, Nevada
Watatikka, Ryegrass Seed Eaters, Ruby Valley, Nevada
Wiyimpihtikka, Buffalo Berry Eaters

Ute

 Northern Ute
 San Pitch, central Utah
 Seuvarits, Moah Utah area
 Timpanogos, north central Utah
 Uncompahgre (Tabeguache), central and northern Colorado
 Uintah
 White River Utes, Colorado and eastern Utah
 Parianuche, along Colorado River valley in central and western Colorado 
 Sabuagana, along Colorado River valley in central and western Colorado 
 Yampa
 Southern Ute
 Capote, southeastern Colorado and New Mexico
 Muache, south and central Colorado
 Ute Mountain
 Weeminuche, western Colorado, eastern Utah, northwestern New Mexico
 Absorbed by the Paiute Indian Tribe of Utah
 Moanunts, Salina, Utah
 Pahvant, western Utah

History

The oldest known petroglyphs in North America are in the Great Basin. Near the banks of Winnemucca Lake in Nevada, this rock art dates between 10,500 and 14,800 years ago.

Archaeologists called the local period 9,000 BCE to 400 CE the Great Basin Desert Archaic Period. This was followed by the time of the Fremont culture, who were hunter-gatherers and agriculturalists. Numic language-speakers, ancestors of today's Western Shoshone and both Northern Paiute people and Southern Paiute people entered the region around the 14th century CE.

The first Europeans to reach the area was the Spanish Domínguez–Escalante expedition, who passed far from present day Delta, Utah in 1776. Great Basin settlement was relatively free of non-Native settlers until the first Mormon settlers arrived in 1847. Within ten years, the first Indian reservation was established, in order to assimilate the native population. The Goshute Reservation was created in 1863. The attempted acculturation process included sending children to Indian schools and limiting the landbases and resources of the reservations.

Because their contact with European-Americans and African-Americans occurred comparatively late, Great Basin tribes maintain their religion and culture and were leading proponents of 19th century cultural and religious renewals. Two Paiute prophets, Wodziwob and Wovoka, introduced the Ghost Dance in a ceremony to commune with departed loved ones and bring renewal of buffalo herds and precontact lifeways. The Ute Bear Dance emerged on the Great Basin. The Sun Dance and Peyote religion flourished in the Great Basin, as well.

In 1930, the Ely Shoshone Reservation was established, followed by the Duckwater Indian Reservation in 1940.

Conditions for the Native American population of the Great Basin were erratic throughout the 20th century. Economic improvement emerged as a result of President Franklin Roosevelt's Indian New Deal in the 1930s, while activism and legal victories in the 1970s have improved conditions significantly. Nevertheless, the communities continue to struggle against chronic poverty and all of the resulting problems: unemployment; substance abuse; and high suicide rates.

Today self-determination, beginning with the 1975 passage of the Indian Self-determination and Education Assistance Act, has enabled Great Basin tribes to develop economic opportunities for their members.

Cultures

Different ethnic groups of Great Basin tribes share certain common cultural elements that distinguish them from surrounding groups. All but the Washoe traditionally speak Numic languages, and tribal groups, who historically lived peacefully and often shared common territories, have intermingled considerably. Prior to the 20th century, Great Basin peoples were predominantly hunters and gatherers.

"Desert Archaic" or more simply "The Desert Culture" refers to the culture of the Great Basin tribes. This culture is characterized by the need for mobility to take advantage of seasonally available food supplies. The use of pottery was rare due to its weight, but intricate baskets were woven for containing water, cooking food, winnowing grass seeds and storage—including the storage of pine nuts, a Paiute-Shoshone staple.  Heavy items such as metates would be cached rather than carried from foraging area to foraging area. Agriculture was not practiced within the Great Basin itself, although it was practiced in adjacent areas (modern agriculture in the Great Basin requires either large mountain reservoirs or deep artesian wells).  Likewise, the Great Basin tribes had no permanent settlements, although winter villages might be revisited winter after winter by the same group of families.  In the summer, the largest group was usually the nuclear family due to the low density of food supplies.

In the early historical period the Great Basin tribes were actively expanding to the north and east, where they developed a horse-riding bison-hunting culture. These people, including the Bannock and Eastern Shoshone share traits with Plains Indians.

Today, the Great Basin Native Artists, which was cofounded by Melissa Melero-Moose represents Indigenous visual artists from the region and curates groups exhibitions.

Notes

External links
 Great Basin Native Artists, a collective of indigenous artists from the Great Basin
 Great Basin artwork in Infinity of Nations, National Museum of the American Indian

 
 
Great Basin
Great Basin
Native American tribes in California
Native American tribes in Idaho
Native American tribes in Nevada
Native American tribes in Oregon
Native American tribes in Utah
Native American tribes in Wyoming
Great Basin
Western United States
Great Basin

fi:Pohjois-Amerikan ylätasangon intiaanit